Jayanta Dastidar (born 13 November 1973) is an Indian former cricketer. He played three first-class matches for Bengal in 1991/92.

See also
 List of Bengal cricketers

References

External links
 

1973 births
Living people
Indian cricketers
Bengal cricketers
Cricketers from Kolkata